Astrothelium flavostiolatum is a species of corticolous (bark-dwelling), crustose lichen in the family Trypetheliaceae. Found in Ecuador, it was formally described as a new species in 2016 by Dutch lichenologist André Aptroot. The thallus is covered with small wart-like structures, and consists of swollen and distended (bullate) areas that coalesce, forming a continuous structure. The presence of the lichen does not induce the formation of galls in its host. A yellow anthraquinone is the only lichen product that was detected from the species using thin-layer chromatography. The group of characteristics of the lichen distinguishing it from others in Astrothelium are its irregular,  thallus; its solitary to confluent ascomata with yellowish ostiolar rims, and the coarse thallus verrucae.

References

flavostiolatum
Lichen species
Lichens described in 2016
Lichens of Ecuador
Taxa named by André Aptroot